Bradford Field  was a private-use airport located  west of the central business district of Flemington, a borough in Hunterdon County, New Jersey, United States. It was privately owned by Howard A. Greenwald.

References

External links 

Defunct airports in New Jersey
Transportation buildings and structures in Hunterdon County, New Jersey